Jacobs Vehicle Systems, Inc. is an American company that engineers, develops and manufacturers commercial vehicle retarding and valve actuation technologies.  The company produces light-duty, medium-duty, and heavy-duty engine brakes, recreational vehicle exhaust brakes, aftermarket parts and tune-up kits to heavy-duty diesel engine manufacturers in its domestic market in America, as well as in Asia and Europe.
The company was incorporated in 1990 and is based in Bloomfield, Connecticut.  Jacobs Vehicle Systems, Inc. operates as a subsidiary of Altra Industrial Motion Corporation. On 9 February 2022, Cummins, Inc. announced an agreement to acquire Jacobs Vehicle Systems from Altra.

History 
The Jacobs Engine Brake has been on the market since 1961, better known as the “Jake Brake”.  The value of an engine retarder had been recognised many years earlier. In England in 1905, the motor car manufacturer Rover provided on its "16-20" model an auxiliary camshaft and modified exhaust cams which, when selected via a camshaft pedal, lifted the exhaust valve twice to every revolution of the shaft, causing air to be taken in from the exhaust pipe on every downward movement of the piston, compressed on the upward stroke, and then exhausted. Rover declared that "the braking effect of this device is very pronounced - in fact, for all ordinary purposes it can be used without recourse to the friction brakes".
Some 26 years later, and despite the advances in friction braking, the need for such a system was experienced by inventor Clessie L. Cummins.  In August 1931, Clessie Cummins, Ford Moyer, and Dave Evans driving a Cummins diesel powered Indiana truck from New York to Los Angeles attempted to set a new truck speed record across the continent.  All went well until the descent of the Cajon Pass leading into San Bernardino, CA, a long and steep gravel road which almost led to the demise of the truck and its driver, Clessie Cummins.
In 1955, Clessie began studying what might be done to turn his engine into an effective “brake”, or vehicle retarder.  An idea for a practical method came to Clessie in 1957.  The idea revolved around taking advantage of perfectly timed motion already built into Cummins and Detroit Diesel engines; these engines have a third cam on the main camshaft that activates the fuel injector of each cylinder.  A simple retrofit mechanism could transfer motion to open the exhaust valve.  A patent was ultimately granted by the U.S. Patent Office.
Although the principles were proven by mechanically transferring the injector motion, a more practical method was to use a fully hydraulic motion and force transfer.  The first retarder housings of the prototype design were installed on a Cummins diesel engine in a truck owned and operated by the Sheldon Oil Company.  The initial run with the engine brake was to one of their plants just at the eastern base of the grade, down the Sierras on U.S. Highway 50 near Lake Tahoe.

In April 1960, Jacobs Manufacturing Company made the decision to establish its new Clessie L. Cummins Division, (now named Jacobs Vehicle Systems) for the manufacture of the engine brake.  The first production units for the Cummins NH series engines left the factory in 1961, followed shortly by a brake for the Detroit 71 series.

The firm split in 1986 and chuck manufacturing now takes place in Clemson, South Carolina and engine brake production in Bloomfield, CT.

How A Jake Brake Works 
A “Jake Brake” is an engine compression release brake used especially for steep hill downgrades.  The Jake Brake opens the exhaust valves when the piston is near top dead center (where ignition normally occurs).  On the upstroke, the piston compresses the air in the cylinder to 1/15th its original volume, which creates drag on the engine.  The Jacobs Engine Brake then releases the compressed air and the energy stored in it before it can push back on the piston during the down stroke.  The Jake Brake turns a power producing engine into a power absorbing air compressor and in turn, causes the truck to slow down.
Inside of the truck, the driver can choose how many cylinders to activate; the more cylinders activated, the more slowing of the truck.

Jacob Vehicle System Technologies

Exhaust Brakes
Uses back pressure to increase braking power by restricting the flow of exhaust gasses and increasing backpressure inside the engine.  The increased backpressure in the engine creates resistance against the pistons, slowing the crankshafts rotation and helping to control the vehicle speed.

Bleeder Brakes
The bleeder brake is a simplified version of traditional engine brakes. When the bleeder brake is turned on, a piston extends to its full stroke and stays there, holding the exhaust valve open a small, fixed distance throughout the entire four-stroke engine cycle. Since the bleeder brake only holds the exhaust valve open a fixed distance, it can be designed so that it does not put any load on the camshaft and most of the overhead components.

Compression Release Brakes
When activated, the Jacobs Engine Brake opens the exhaust valves near the top of the compression stroke, releasing the highly compressed air through the exhaust system. Little energy is returned to the piston, and as the cycle repeats, the energy of the trucks forward motion is dissipated, causing the truck to slow down.

Variable Valve Actuation
Allows for real-time adjustment to valve opening and closing for precise control of valve motion. By creating a hydraulic link between the cam and the valve, VVA tunes the engine across its operating range.

High Power Density
Provides large displacement retarding power in small and medium displacement engines.  HPD consists of two dedicated rocker arms and two collapsible bridges per cylinder, which enables a second braking event during each engine cycle.

Customers 
C&C Trucks, CNHTC, Cummins, DAF, Daimler, Detroit Diesel, Deutz, DFM, Doosan, FAW, FOTON, FUSO, HINO, HYUNDAI, Navistar, Paccar, SDEC

References

External links
 Official website

Vehicle braking technologies
Companies based in Hartford County, Connecticut
Manufacturing companies based in Connecticut
Bloomfield, Connecticut